Vingtaine  de la Vallée is one of the six vingtaines of St Lawrence Parish on the Channel Island of Jersey.

References

Vingtaines of Jersey
Saint Lawrence, Jersey